Joytime II is the second studio album by American DJ and record producer Marshmello. It was released on June 22, 2018.

Background
Billboard said Marshmello "promised" the album to be musically similar to its predecessor, Joytime. During his performance at the 2018 Electric Daisy Carnival festival, Marshmello played material from the album, which he later uploaded in video to his Twitter page. On Instagram, he revealed the album cover, captioning "For all my day one mellogang...Joytime II the album is coming soon."

Singles
The first single from the album is "Tell Me", which Marshmello promised to release on June 8, 2018, if his social media post about the song received 5,000 comments. The post stated "I will drop Tell Me, one of the singles from Joytime II, this Friday if this post gets 5,000 comments about one good thing you did this week." "Check This Out" was released on June 15, 2018 as the second single of the album.

Critical reception

Rolling Stone described the album as monotonous and Marshmello's decision to not feature guests as disappointing, stating "every song sounds like it has already been pre-leased for use by energy-drink companies or extreme-sports squads." The album was given a 'one-and-a-half star' rating by the magazine.

Tommy Monroe of Chorus.fm reviewed the album as "a filled, fun electronic club sounds that later become boring due to its monotony. He praised tracks "Flashbacks", "Tell Me" and "Together" for their feature but criticized "Paralyzed", and "Rooftops" for the lack of rhythm.

Track listing
Adapted from iTunes.

Charts

References

2018 albums
Marshmello albums
Future bass albums
Sequel albums